This is a list of members of the Australian Senate from 1926 to 1929. Half of its members were elected at the 16 December 1922 election and had terms starting on 1 July 1923 and finishing on 30 June 1929; the other half were elected at the 14 November 1925 election and had terms starting on 1 July 1926 and finishing on 30 June 1932. The process for filling casual vacancies was complex. While senators were elected for a six-year term, people appointed to a casual vacancy only held office until the earlier of the next election for the House of Representatives or the Senate.

Notes

References

Members of Australian parliaments by term
20th-century Australian politicians
Australian Senate lists